This article is a list of Mid-American Conference Champions.  The Mid-American Conference sponsors 23 sports, 11 men's and 12 women's.

Membership
Years listed are the calendar years in which membership began and ended. In the case of affiliate members, the first or last year of competition may differ from the start or end of membership.

Current members
Ohio Bobcats (1947–present)
Miami RedHawks (1948–present)
Western Michigan Broncos (1948–present)
Kent State Golden Flashes (1951–present)
Toledo Rockets (1951–present)
Bowling Green Falcons (1952–present)
Central Michigan Chippewas (1972–present)
Eastern Michigan Eagles (1972–present)
Ball State Cardinals (1973–present)
Northern Illinois Huskies (1973–1986, 1997–present)
Akron Zips (1992–present)
Buffalo Bulls (1998–present)

Affiliate members
 Missouri State Bears – Field hockey (2005–present); men's swimming and diving
 Binghamton Bearcats – Men's tennis (2014–present)
 Longwood Lancers – Field hockey (2014–present)
 Evansville Purple Aces – Men's swimming and diving
 Southern Illinois Salukis – Men's swimming and diving
 Appalachian State Mountaineers – Field hockey (2017–present)
 SIU Edwardsville Cougars – wrestling (2018–present)

Former members
Butler Bulldogs (1947–1950)
Cincinnati Bearcats (1947–1953)
Western Reserve Red Cats (1947–1955)
Marshall Thundering Herd (1954–1969, 1997–2005)

Former affiliate members
Chicago State Cougars – Men's tennis (2008–2013)
Florida Atlantic Owls – Men's soccer (2008–2013)
Hartwick Hawks – Men's soccer (2007–2014)
IPFW Mastodons – Men's soccer (2005–2008), men's tennis (2002–2007)
Kentucky Wildcats - Men's soccer (1995–2004)
Louisville Cardinals – Field hockey (1994–2005)
 Northern Iowa Panthers – Wrestling (2012–2017)
Temple Owls – Football (2007–2012)
UCF Golden Knights – Football (2002–2005)
 UMass Minutemen – Football (2012–2015)
 Missouri Tigers – Wrestling (2012–2021)
 Old Dominion Monarchs – Wrestling (2013–2021)
 West Virginia Mountaineers – Men's soccer (2012–2021)
 SIU Edwardsville Cougars – Men's soccer (2017–2020)

Sports

Baseball 

The baseball season begins in February and finishes with the conference tournament in May at Sprenger Stadium in Avon, Ohio.

* One-game playoff winner. Prior to the conference tournament, regular season ties were broken with a one-game playoff.

Basketball (men's) 
The men's basketball tournament is held in March at Rocket Mortgage FieldHouse in Cleveland.  The tournament began in 1980 and has been held in Cleveland since 2000.

* One-game playoff winner. Prior to the conference tournament, regular season ties were broken with a one-game playoff.

Basketball (women's) 
The women's basketball tournament is held in March at Quicken Loans Arena in Cleveland.  The tournament was first held in 1982 and has been in Cleveland since 2000.  It moved to Quicken Loans Arena in 2001.

Cross country (men's) 
The men's cross country championship is held in October along with the women's cross country championship.

Cross country (women's) 
The women's cross country championship is held in October along with the men's cross country championship.

Field hockey 
The field hockey tournament championship is hosted by the highest seed.

Football 
The football championship game is held in November and pits the East Division champion and the West Division champion. From its inception in 1997 to 2003, it was held at the home field of the division champion with the best conference record (with tiebreakers employed as needed). Since the 2004 edition, it has been held at Ford Field in Detroit.

Golf (men's) 

The men's golf tournament is held annually in May. In 2018 it was held at Sycamore Hills Golf Club in Fort Wayne, Indiana.

Golf (women's) 

The women's golf tournament is held in April and rotates to different courses each year. In 2018 it was held at Naperville Country Club in Naperville, Illinois.

Gymnastics 

The gymnastics championship meet is rotated among the seven conference members who sponsor women's gymnastics.

Lacrosse (women's) 
The MAC began competing in Lacrosse for the 2021 season.

Soccer (men's) 
The men's soccer tournament begins in late October at campus sites.  It concludes in early November at the highest remaining seed's home field. 2022 season will be the last sponsored season by the MAC.

* Akron won the 2010 NCAA Men's Division I Soccer Tournament

Soccer (women's) 
The women's soccer tournament begins in late October at campus sites.  It concludes in early November at the highest remaining seed's home field.

Softball 

The softball tournament is held in May to determine the winner of the conference's automatic bid to the NCAA tournament.  It has been held at various sites throughout the years.  In 2008 the tournament returned to Firestone Stadium in Akron, Ohio where it was played from 2002 to 2005 after being played in 2006 and 2007 at Currie Stadium in Midland, Michigan.  The first tournament was held in 1982 and the MAC added conference regular season play in 1983.  From 1986 through 1995 the MAC did not have a conference tournament; the regular-season champion was awarded the league's bid to the NCAA tournament.  In 1996 the tournament returned, but the championship game had to be suspended due to weather and once again the regular season champion won the automatic NCAA bid.

Swimming and diving (men's)

Swimming and diving (women's)

Tennis (men's) 
The men's tennis championships are held in April in Fort Wayne, Indiana.

Tennis (women's) 
From 1981 to 1996 the conference champion was awarded based on points won at the MAC Individual Championships. The conference tournament changed to the current team format in 1997.

Indoor track and field (men's) 
The men's indoor track and field championships are held in February along with the women's championships.=

Indoor track and field (women's) 
The women's indoor track and field championships are held in February along with the men's championships.  In 2010, they were held in Mount Pleasant, Michigan.

Outdoor track and field (men's) 
The Men's Outdoor Track and Field Championships are held each year in late May.

Outdoor track and field (women's) 
The Women's Outdoor Track and Field Championships are held each year in late May.

Volleyball 
The volleyball tournament is played in November at campus sites.

Wrestling 
The wrestling championship is rotated among the conference members.

References

External links
 Mid-American Conference official website

Mid-American Conference
Champions